Xingtang County is a county of Hebei Province, North China, it is under the administration of the prefecture-level city of Shijiazhuang, the capital of the province.

Administrative divisions
Towns:
Longzhou, Nanqiao, Shangbei, Koutou

Townships:
Duyanggang Township, Anxiang Township, Zhili Township, Shitong Township, Diying Township, Chengzhai Township, Shangfang Township, Yuting Township, Beihe Township, Shangyanzhuang Township, Jiukouzi Township

Climate

References

External links

County-level divisions of Hebei
Shijiazhuang